Chwee Teck (C.T.) Lim is a Singaporean scientist  and entrepreneur. He is a specialist in human disease mechanobiology and in developing medical technologies for disease diagnosis and precision therapy and bringing them from the laboratory to the bedside.

Academic career
He is currently the inaugural National University of Singapore Society (NUSS) Professor at the Department of Biomedical Engineering, Director of the Institute for Health Innovation & Technology (iHealthtech) (2018–present) at the National University of Singapore (NUS), and Founding Director of the  Singapore Health Technologies Consortium (HealthTEC). He is also an elected Fellow of the International Union for Physical and Engineering Sciences in Medicine, the US National Academy of Inventors, American Institute for Medical and Biological Engineering, the International Academy of Medical and Biological Engineering, ASEAN Academy of Engineering and Technology, the Academy of Engineering (Singapore), the Singapore National Academy of Science and an elected Council Member of the World Council of Biomechanics.

Research 
His research interests include human disease mechanobiology, microfluidic technologies for disease diagnosis and precision therapy, and soft wearable technologies for biomedical applications. He currently heads the MechanoBioEngineering Laboratory at NUS. He has more than 420 peer-reviewed journal publications in high impact journals, for example Nature, Nature Materials, Nature Physics  among others.

Lim is internationally known for his interdisciplinary approach in combining mechanics with biology and medicine to obtain fundamental insights into how adverse changes in the mechanical properties of cells and tissues can lead to the pathology of diseases (mechanopathology) such as malaria and cancer.

From the outset of his career, Lim understood that for research to make an impact, it needs to be translated from the laboratory to the bedside.  This is where he makes the greatest contribution by leveraging on his basic research outcomes and his expertise in engineering to develop a new generation of biomedical technologies for better disease diagnosis, prognosis and precision therapy. In fact, some of his biomedical microfluidic technologies has been commercialised by startups that he has cofounded.  

One example involves a biochips to better detect and diagnose cancer.  These microfluidic chips are among the world's first in being able to isolate circulating tumor cells from patient’s blood. This patented technology is simple and easy to use, providing a next generation of non-invasive 'liquid biopsy' devices for cancer diagnosis. The key innovation involved cancer cells being captured and analysed from a routine blood draw rather than through the painful route of needle aspiration tumour biopsy.  This technology has since been commercialized by Biolidics Limited which he co-founded in 2009 and which IPO in 2018.  The technology has also obtained CE (IVD) certification as well as FDA listing in both China and the USA.  He and his team have also received numerous awards and accolades for their technology including the IP Champion, WIPO-IPOS IP Awards 2019, TIE50 Award (world’s top 50 startups) 2014, Credit Suisse Technopreneur of the Year Award 2012, Wall Street Journal Asian Innovation Awards 2012 (Gold Award), Asian Entrepreneurship Award 2012 (First Prize),  President’s Technology Award] 2011 among others.

In the midst of the COVID-19 pandemic in 2020, Lim and his team developed two portable point-of-care rapid diagnostic tests – a portable micro-PCR system called EPIDAX and a rapid antigen test kit called abSenseTM.

Leadership 
Lim is Director of the Institute for Health Innovation and Technology (iHealhtech) at the National University of Singapore.

Lim founded a consortium called the Singapore Health Technologies Consortium (HealthTEC) which comprises a network of over 25 health technology companies with the aim of promoting closer research collaboration and quicker transfer of knowledge and research outcomes from academia to industry.  HealthTEC is supported by the National Research Foundation.

Entrepreneurship 
Lim is a serial entrepreneur who drives innovation and technological advancements, nurtures and supports both young and aspired researchers to venture into entrepreneurship through his leadership. He has currently co-founded six spin-off companies such as Biolidics, Microtube Technologies and Flexosense that are commercialising technologies developed in his laboratory.

Awards and Honors 
 Highly Cited Researcher, 2018, 2019, 2021.
 Asia’s Most Influential Scientist Award, Fortune Times, 2021.
 IES Prestigious Engineering Achievement Award 2021. 
 HFSP Award 2018.
 ASEAN Outstanding Engineering Achievement Award 2016.
 14 inspiring innovators from asia, Asian Scientist, 2016.
 IES Prestigious Engineering Achievement Award, 2016. 
 Asian Scientist 100, 2016. 
 Seven Scientists from Singapore to Watch, Asian Scientist, 2016.
 Vladimir K. Zworykin Award, 2015.
 Outstanding Researcher Award, NUS University Awards, 2014.
 President's Technology Award 2011.
 IES Prestigious Engineering Achievement Award, 2010.
 Cited in “MIT Technology Review: 10 Emerging Technologies and their impact”, 2006.

References 

Singaporean scientists
Living people
Alumni of the University of Cambridge
Year of birth missing (living people)